SWI may refer to:

Places:
 Switzerland (this is not the ISO 3166-1 code, which is CHE)
 Swindon railway station (National Rail code SWI), serving Swindon, Wiltshire, United Kingdom

In science and technology:
 SWI-Prolog, a free implementation of the programming language Prolog
 Susceptibility weighted imaging, in magnetic resonance imaging (MRI) used in medical contexts
 Software interrupt, an interrupt routine in a computer operating system
 SWI, an assembler mnemonic to perform a software interrupt on the ARM microprocessor family
 Szilagyi Waterspout Index

Other uses:
 Swissinfo, a service of the Swiss Broadcasting Corporation
 Structured Word Inquiry, a pedagogical technique involving the scientific investigation of the spelling of words